Huácar District is one of eight districts of the province of Ambo in Peru.

References